The Guatemalan pygmy owl (Glaucidium cobanense) is a small "typical owl" in subfamily Surniinae. However, some taxonomic systems consider it to be a subspecies of northern pygmy owl (G. gnoma). It is found in Mexico, Guatemala, and Honduras.

Taxonomy and systematics

The Guatemalan pygmy owl's taxonomy is unsettled. The International Ornithological Committee (IOC) and BirdLife International's Handbook of the Birds of the World (HBW) consider it a distinct species. The North American Classification Committee (NACC) of the American Ornithological Society rejected that definition and treats it as a subspecies of northern pygmy owl. The Clements taxonomy follows the NACC treatment.

Description

Adults have two color morphs, one mostly rufous and the other gray-brown, though there are some intergrades between them. The rufous morph is more common. The head and upperparts are the basal color with paler spots, and the tail is the same color with four paler bands on its underside. The nape has a pair of black and white marks that resemble eyes. The rufous morph has small buffy spots on its forecrown. The breasts are pale with heavy streaking of the basal color. It has an ill-defined facial disc with pale "eyebrows" and "moustaches". Its beak, eyes, and feet are yellow.

Distribution and habitat

The Guatemalan pygmy owl is found from Mexico's Chiapas state through Guatemala into Honduras. It inhabits the edges and openings of several montane landscapes including pine savannah, pine-oak forest, and cloudforest. It is usually found above  of elevation.

Behavior

Movement

The Guatemalan pygmy owl is believed to be mostly resident but some seasonal elevational movement is possible.

Feeding

The Guatemalan pygmy owl's diet and hunting habits have not been separately described from those of the northern pygmy owl as a whole. That species takes a very wide variety of prey including reptiles, mammals, birds, and arthropods. It is primarily a daytime hunter and probably hunts into the evening as well.

Breeding

The Guatemalan pygmy owl's breeding phenology has not been separately described from that of the northern pygmy owl as a whole. That species appears to be seasonally monogamous and defends a nesting territory. It nests in tree cavities, both natural and made by woodpeckers. The cavity may be lined with feathers and strips of soft bark. Clutch sizes of two to seven have been reported. Incubation length and time to fledging have not been well defined. The female alone incubates eggs and broods nestlings; the male does most of the provisioning.

Vocalization

The Guatemalan pygmy owl's call is "a rapid series of toot notes...with little or no pause...toot-toot-toot-toot'toot-toot'toot-toot...."

Status

The IUCN has assessed the Guatemalan pygmy owl as being of Least Concern, though its population size is unknown and believed to be decreasing. No specific threats have been identified. It is considered locally uncommon throughout its range.

References

Guatemalan pygmy owl
Birds of Guatemala
Guatemalan pygmy owl
Guatemalan pygmy owl